Robert Samuel Finn (August 8, 1922 – August 16, 2022) was an American mathematician.

Biography
Finn was born in Buffalo, New York, on August 8, 1922. He received in 1951 his PhD from Syracuse University under Abe Gelbart with the thesis On some properties of the solution of a class of non-linear partial differential equations. As a postdoc he was in 1953 at the Institute for Advanced Study and in 1953/54 at the Institute for Hydrodynamics at the University of Maryland. He became in 1954 an assistant professor at the University of Southern California and in 1956 an associate professor at California Institute of Technology. Beginning in  1959 he was a professor at Stanford University.

At the beginning of his career Finn did research on minimal surfaces and quasiconformal mappings and later in his career on mathematical problems of hydrodynamics, such as mathematically rigorous treatments of capillary action. He was a visiting professor at the University of Bonn and several other universities. He was an exchange scientist in 1978 at the Soviet Academy of Sciences and in 1987 at the Akademie der Wissenschaften der DDR. In 1994 he received an honorary doctorate from the University of Leipzig. For the academic years 1958/59 and 1965/66 he held Guggenheim Fellowships. From 1979, he was an editor of the Pacific Journal of Mathematics.

Finn turned 100 on August 8, 2022. He died eight days later, in Palo Alto, California, on August 16, 2022.

Selected works
 
 
 
 with Paul Concus:

References

External links
 

1922 births
2022 deaths
20th-century American mathematicians
21st-century American mathematicians
Syracuse University alumni
Stanford University faculty
Geometers
Mathematicians from New York (state)
Writers from Buffalo, New York
Institute for Advanced Study visiting scholars
University System of Maryland people
University of Southern California faculty
California Institute of Technology faculty
Men centenarians
American centenarians